Copelatus geayi is a species of diving beetle. It is part of the genus Copelatus in the subfamily Copelatinae of the family Dytiscidae. It was described by Régimbart in 1904.

References

geayi
Beetles described in 1904